Kada is the surname of:

 Alexis Kada (born 1994), Cameroonian footballer
 Kada no Azumamaro (1669–1736), Japanese poet and philologist
 Tarik Kada (born 1996), Dutch-Moroccan footballer
 Yukiko Kada (born 1950), former governor of Shiga Prefecture, Japan

See also

 Joe Cada (born 1987), American poker player
Kaja (name)